U.S. Post Office is a historic post office building located at Carrollton, Carroll County, Missouri.  It was designed by the Office of the Supervising Architect under James Knox Taylor and built between 1910 and 1912.  It is a two-story, rectangular, Renaissance Revival style building constructed of regular coursed, smooth cut, Missouri limestone.  It has a low hipped roof of red tile and features two large round arched windows flanking the main entrance.

It was listed on the National Register of Historic Places in 1977.

References

Carrollton
Renaissance Revival architecture in Missouri
Government buildings completed in 1912
Buildings and structures in Carroll County, Missouri
National Register of Historic Places in Carroll County, Missouri